The 2000 West Lancashire District Council election took place on 4 May 2000 to elect members of  West Lancashire District Council in Lancashire, England. One third of the council was up for election and the Labour Party stayed in overall control of the council.

After the election, the composition of the council was:

Election result

References

2000
2000 English local elections
2000s in Lancashire